Mossimo Giannulli (born Massimo Giannulli; June 4, 1963) is an American fashion designer who founded Mossimo, a mid-range clothing company, in 1986. In March 2019, Giannulli and his wife, actress Lori Loughlin, were charged and arrested in connection with the college admissions bribery scandal. Both agreed to plead guilty to the relevant charges and were sentenced to jail time and a fine in August 2020. Giannulli served a five-month prison sentence from November 2020 until April 2021, while his wife served a two-month prison sentence, from October 2020 to December 2020.

Early life 
Giannulli was born Massimo Giannulli on June 4, 1963 in Los Angeles to parents of Italian descent, Gene, an architect, and Nancy Giannulli, a homemaker. He was raised in Encino, California. In the first grade, he changed his first name to Mossimo at the suggestion of a teacher who insisted it was easier to pronounce.

According to some sources, after graduating from high school, he studied business and architecture at the University of Southern California for three years before dropping out in 1987; in the wake of the college entrance scandal in which Giannulli was involved, however, CNN reported that Giannulli tricked his father into giving him money for tuition (which he used to fund his t-shirt business) and falsified report cards, with his actual education at the university consisting only of attending "USC during the spring semester in 1984, but not as a fully matriculated student. He was enrolled in the College of Continuing Education, a non-degree program open to anyone 'with no formal admission requirements'"; he lived at the Beta Theta Pi fraternity house, however, which according to a fraternity spokesman was due to the fact that "having non-matriculating students associate with the fraternity would not have been uncommon."

Mossimo

Giannulli created Mossimo, a mid-range American clothing company in 1986 on Balboa Island in Newport Beach, California. Mossimo specializes in youth and teenage clothing such as shirts, jeans, jackets, socks, underwear, and accessories.

During his first year in business he grossed $1 million. The following year he made $4 million. Mossimo expanded the line in 1991 to include sweatshirts, knits, and sweaters. By 1995, the collection included women's clothing and men's tailored suits. After eight years in business, Mossimo, Inc. had grown into a multimillion-dollar lifestyle sportswear and accessories company.

Mossimo went public with an initial public offering in 1996. After shares tumbled from $50 to $4 when the founder tried and failed to make the transition from streetwear/beachwear to high fashion, he took the brand downscale, announcing on March 28, 2000, Mossimo, Inc. a major, multi-product licensing agreement with Target stores, for $27.8 million. Mossimo was acquired by Iconix Brand Group in 2006.

College bribery scandal

Giannulli and his wife Lori Loughlin were arrested on March 12, 2019 in connection with their alleged involvement in a nationwide college entrance exam cheating scandal, regarding their two daughters' (including Olivia Jade) admission to University of Southern California (USC). They were charged with conspiracy to commit mail fraud and honest services fraud. They were released on $1 million bail each. They were among 50 people charged. The couple were also charged with money-laundering offenses in April 2019.

The indictment against the couple alleged that they paid $500,000, disguised as a donation to the Key Worldwide Foundation, so that USC's admissions committee would think that their two daughters would be joining the school's women's rowing team if admitted. In fact, neither young woman had ever trained in the sport and had no plans to do so. Initially denying the charges, Giannulli and his wife later pled guilty as part of a plea bargain.

Prison sentence
Giannulli was sentenced to five months in prison and a $250,000 fine on August 21, 2020, while his wife was sentenced to two months in prison and a $150,000 fine. On conviction, the couple were expelled from the Bel Air Country Club. Giannulli and Loughlin both had until November 19, to report to prison. On October 30, 2020, Giannuli refused to report to prison after Loughlin did so. The same day, Loughlin had her right to have people, including Giannulli, visit her in prison suspended due to the ongoing COVID-19 pandemic.

Giannulli entered the medium-security federal penitentiary in Lompoc, California on November 19, 2020, to serve his five-month sentence and was scheduled for release on April 17, 2021. Prior to his entry, he was seen with a shaved head and tougher look. In prison, he was placed in isolation due to COVID-19 in a medium security cell, rather than a minimum security cell that he was supposed to be in. He complained about this rough treatment to his family and his son, Gianni. Gianni posted on Instagram that the "mental and physical damage being done from such isolation and treatment is wrong." On April 2, 2021, Giannulli was released to home confinement where he was slated to remain until the completion of his sentence on April 17, 2021. However, he would be released from home confinement a day early on April 16, 2021. He is currently on parole until April 2023.

References

External links
 

1963 births
Living people
University of Southern California alumni
American company founders
Place of birth missing (living people)
American fashion designers
American textile industry businesspeople
People from Encino, Los Angeles
American people of Italian descent
21st-century American criminals